Agonopterix thurneri is a moth of the family Depressariidae. It is found in North Macedonia.

References

External links
lepiforum.de

Moths described in 1941
Agonopterix
Moths of Europe